Dorota Kuczkowska (born 21 July 1979 in Warsaw) is a Polish sprint canoer who has competed since the early 2000s. She won three medals at the ICF Canoe Sprint World Championships with a silver (K-4 1000 m: 2001) and two bronzes (K-2 200 m: 2007, K-4 200 m: 2001).

Kuczkowska also finished fourth in the K-4 500 m event at the 2008 Summer Olympics in Beijing.

References

1979 births
Living people
Canoeists at the 2008 Summer Olympics
Olympic canoeists of Poland
Polish female canoeists
Sportspeople from Warsaw
ICF Canoe Sprint World Championships medalists in kayak